David Arturo “Bolita” Alcántar García  (born 19 April 1989) is a former Mexican footballer who played as a midfielder.

References

1989 births
Living people
Mexican footballers
Association football midfielders
Club León footballers
Unión de Curtidores footballers
San Luis F.C. players
Potros UAEM footballers
Leones Negros UdeG footballers
Liga MX players
Ascenso MX players
Liga Premier de México players
Footballers from Guanajuato
Sportspeople from León, Guanajuato